The discography of Fight Like Apes, an Irish alternative rock band, consists of three studio albums, three extended plays and several singles.

Albums

Studio albums

Live albums

Extended plays

Compilation albums

Singles

Music videos

References

Discographies of Irish artists
Rock music group discographies